São Caetano is a civil parish in the municipality of Cantanhede, Portugal. The population in 2011 was 801, in an area of 19.04 km². It contains 10 settlements: Perboi de Cima, Perboi de Baixo, Rilhóses, Sardão, Olho de S. Caetano, S. Caetano, Corgo Côvo, Criação, Pisão and Cantos.

References

Freguesias of Cantanhede, Portugal